John J. Shonk III (April 30, 1918 – April 26, 1984) was an American football end who played for the Philadelphia Eagles of the National Football League (NFL) in 1941. He played college football for West Virginia before he was drafted by the Eagles in the 19th round (171st overall) of the 1941 NFL Draft. He was team captain for West Virginia in 1940. He served in World War II for the United States Army.

References

1918 births
1984 deaths
Sportspeople from Charleston, West Virginia
Players of American football from West Virginia
American football ends
West Virginia Mountaineers football players
Philadelphia Eagles players
United States Army Air Forces personnel of World War II